The 1807 Vermont gubernatorial election for Governor of Vermont took place throughout September, and resulted in the election of Israel Smith to a one-year term.

The Vermont General Assembly met in Woodstock on October 8. The Vermont House of Representatives appointed a committee to examine the votes of the freemen of Vermont for governor, lieutenant governor, treasurer, and members of the governor's council.

The committee's examination of the votes showed that Israel Smith defeated incumbent Isaac Tichenor for a one-year term. In the election for lieutenant governor, the voters selected Paul Brigham for his twelfth one-year term. Benjamin Swan was elected to a one-year term as treasurer, his eighth.

In the races for lieutenant governor and treasurer, the vote totals and names of other candidates were not recorded. In the race for governor, a contemporary newspaper article reported the results as follows.

Results

References

Vermont gubernatorial elections
gubernatorial
Vermont